Gallery Place is a small urban power center in Downtown Washington, D.C. in D.C.'s Chinatown and also in the F Street shopping district, the traditional downtown shopping and entertainment area. It is adjacent to Capital One Arena and the Gallery Place/Chinatown station of the Washington Metro rail is underneath the center. It opened in 2004. The only remaining anchor left is Regal Cinemas. Former big-box store anchors include Bed, Bath & Beyond and Urban Outfitters.

On December 6, 2019, it was announced that Bed Bath & Beyond would shutter.

On December 28, 2020, Urban Outfitters closed permanently, leaving Regal Cinemas as the only anchor left.

On January 19, 2023, it was announced that Regal Cinemas would close as part of a plan to close 39 theaters nationwide, which will leave the mall with no anchors left.

References

2004 establishments in Washington, D.C.
Power centers (retail) in the United States
Shopping malls established in 2004
Shopping malls in Washington, D.C.